Charles Lavaivre (February 14, 1905 – March 20, 1967) was a French ice hockey player who competed in the 1924 Winter Olympics.

In 1924 he participated with the French ice hockey team in the Olympic tournament.

External links
List of French ice hockey players
Charles Lavaivre's profile at Sports Reference.com

1905 births
1967 deaths
Ice hockey players at the 1924 Winter Olympics
Olympic ice hockey players of France
People from Chamonix
Sportspeople from Haute-Savoie